Sveti Martin na Muri ("St-Martin-on-the-Mur") is a village and municipality in Međimurje County, in northern Croatia.

History

In Ancient time Roman settlement Halicanum stood on the site of today's village Sveti Martin na Muri. Settlement was located on the Roman road that led from Poetovio to Carnuntum.

In year 1334 Sveti Martin na Muri was recorded as Catholic parish named Sancti Martini in Census of parishes of Zagreb Diocese.
In the late 16th century, the nobleman Nicolaus Malakoczy built a castle in the village of Lapšina. The castle fell into disrepair during 19th century and by the 1930s it was completely demolished.
In year 1911 in the hamlet of Vučkovec mineral water was found while drilling for oil. In 1936 first pool was built at Vučkovec spring which marked the beginning Spa Resort in village of Toplice Sveti Martin.

Municipality of Sveti Martin na Muri was established in year 1992.

Geography

Sveti Martin na Muri is located in part of Međimurje called Gornje Međimurje at border with Slovenia. Village of Sveti Martin na Muri, municipality centre, is about 19 kilometres northwest from Čakovec, and some 110 kilometres north of Zagreb. The municipality covers an area of 25.24 km2.

Geomorphologically, the municipality can be divided into two parts. The southern part consists of low hills called Međimurske Gorice, while the northern part consists of alluvial plain of the river Mur. River Mur divides municipality in two parts. All settlements of municipality are located on the right bank of the Mur, and the left bank consists of the wetlands and fields. Floodplain of River Mur is part of natural protected area called Regional park Mura-Drava.

There is a border crossing with Slovenia in municipality. Border crossing connects municipality with village of Hotiza in Slovenian Prekmurje.
 
Area on the left bank of river Mur is part of ongoing border dispute between Croatia and Slovenia.

Demographics

In the 2011 census, the municipality had a population of 2,605 in 14 villages. Sveti Martin na Muri  is experiencing population decline since the 1980s. The majority of inhabitants are Croats making up 97% of population.

Settlements

Culture

The Church of Saint Martin was built in the late Middle Ages time and later restyled in a baroque manner. There are references to the church from 1334 (Sancti Martini) and then in 1501 (Sancti Martini superioris) and 1650 (Sancti Martini in Komory). The sanctuary is polygonal, arched with late-gothic cross vault, which is carried with ten consoles which are engraved with angel figures and floral ornaments. One has the year 1468 engraved in and there are gothic fresco wall paintings. The present sacristy was built in 1777.

The baroque chapel of Saint Margaret in village of Kapelščak was built in year 1775.

Tourism

The municipality of Sveti Martin na Muri has a highly developed rural tourism industry. It is considered one of the best health and wellness tourism destinations in Croatia, and has received several regional, national and international tourism awards. In 2007, Sveti Martin na Muri was named one of the 10 Best Emerging European Rural Destinations of Excellence. Bathing tourism is based on the healing power of the Vučkovec mineral spring.

Gallery

References

Bibliography

External links

Awarded "EDEN - European Destinations of Excellence" non traditional tourist destination 2007

Municipalities of Croatia
Populated places in Međimurje County
Spa towns in Croatia